Otto Franz Georg Schilling (3 November 1911 – 20 June 1973) was a German-American mathematician known as one of the leading algebraists of his time.

He was born in Apolda and studied in the 1930s at the Universität Jena and the Universität Göttingen under Emmy Noether. After Noether was forced to leave Germany by the Nazis, he found a new advisor in Helmut Hasse, and obtained his Ph.D. from Marburg University in 1934 on the thesis Über gewisse Beziehungen zwischen der Arithmetik hyperkomplexer Zahlsysteme und algebraischer Zahlkörper. He then was post doc at Trinity College, Cambridge before moving to Institute for Advanced Study 1935–37 and the Johns Hopkins University 1937–39. He became an instructor with the University of Chicago in 1939, promoted to assistant professor 1943, associate 1945 and full professor in 1958. In 1961 he moved to Purdue University. He died in Highland Park, Illinois. His students were, among others, the game theorist Anatol Rapoport and the mathematician Harley Flanders.

Articles

 (typo in Schilling's name)

with Saunders Mac Lane: 
with Saunders Mac Lane: 
with Saunders Mac Lane: 

with Saunders Mac Lane: 
with Irving Kaplansky:

Books

References

20th-century German mathematicians
Algebraists
People from Apolda
University of Marburg alumni
Purdue University faculty
University of Chicago faculty
1911 births
1973 deaths
20th-century American mathematicians
German emigrants to the United States